Mohammad Sharaf-e-Alam is an Indian writer, educationist, scholar of Persian language and the first vice chancellor of Maulana Mazharul Haque Arabic and Persian University. He served at the university from 2004 till 2007 and has worked at B. N. College as the head of the department of Persian Language. He is also credited with several publications. Alam, a recipient of the Certificate of Honour from the Government of India, was honored again by the Government, in 2013, with the fourth highest Indian civilian award of Padma Shri.

See also

 Maulana Mazharul Haque University

References

Living people
Recipients of the Padma Shri in literature & education
20th-century Indian educational theorists
Scholars from Bihar
Year of birth missing (living people)